Satyapur is a  village and a gram panchayat in the Debra CD block in the Kharagpur subdivision of the Paschim Medinipur district in the state of West Bengal, India.

Geography

Location                                                

Area overview
Kharagpur subdivision, shown partly in the map alongside, mostly has alluvial soils, except in two CD blocks in the west – Kharagpur I and Keshiary, which mostly have lateritic soils. Around 74% of the total cultivated area is cropped more than once. With a density of population of 787 per km2nearly half of the district's population resides in this subdivision. 14.33% of the population lives in urban areas and 86.67% lives in the rural areas.

Note: The map alongside presents some of the notable locations in the subdivision. All places marked in the map are linked in the larger full screen map.

Demographics
According to the 2011 Census of India, Satyapur had a total population of 3,091, of which 1,553 (50%) were males and 1,538 (50%) were females. There were 319 persons in the age range of 0–6 years. The total number of literate persons in Satyapur was 2252 (81.24% of the population over 6 years).

.*For language details see Debra (community development block)#Language and religion

Satyapur picture gallery

Healthcare
There is a  primary health centre at Satyapur (PO Marhtala) (with 6 beds),

References

External links

Villages in Paschim Medinipur district